On November 2, 2010, the District of Columbia held a U.S. House of Representatives election for its shadow representative. Unlike its non-voting delegate, the shadow representative is only recognized by the district and is not officially sworn or seated. Incumbent Shadow Representative Mike Panetta won election to a  third term.

Primary elections
Primary elections were held on September 14, 2010.

Democratic primary

Candidates
 Mike Panetta, incumbent Shadow Representative
 Nate Bennett-Fleming, law student

Results

Republican primary

Candidates
 Nelson Rimensnyder

Results

Statehood Green primary

Candidates
 Joyce Robinson-Paul

Results

General election
The general election took place on November 3, 2010.

Results

References

Washington, D.C., Shadow Representative elections
2010 elections in Washington, D.C.